Frank Roper  (12 December 1914 – 3 December 2000) was a British sculptor and stained-glass artist who undertook commissions for churches and cathedrals across Wales and England.

In addition to religious commissions, Roper created a wide variety of sculptures which were sold privately and to corporate bodies. His non-religious sculpture included animals and birds, as well as animated sculptures and musical fountains.

Biography 
Frank Roper was born 12 December 1914 in Haworth, Yorkshire. He studied at Keighley Art School (meeting his future wife, Nora Ellison) and the Royal College of Art, London, where he was a student of Henry Moore. In 1947 he became a sculpture lecturer at Cardiff College of Art, later vice principal until 1964. He retired from the college in 1973 "to be free to play my own games". He lived in Penarth and created his own foundry on the ground floor of his house where he made his metal sculptures. Roper has been credited with inventing the lost-polystyrene casting process.

Many of Roper's early commissions stemmed from the need to repair places of worship after they had suffered bomb damage during World War II. He went on to become one of the most prolific of all post-War artists undertaking church commissions. His major commissions included work for Llandaff Cathedral, Durham Cathedral, St David's Cathedral in Pembrokeshire and Peterborough Cathedral. He created a wall-mounted "Stations of the Cross" (1959) for St Martin's in Roath, Cardiff, "Crucifixion with Mary and John" (1965) outside St German's Church, Adamsdown, Cardiff and an aluminium reredos screen (1968) for St Martin le Grand, York. Roper also created engraved and stained glass, for example at St Peter's Church, Chippenham.

Two BBC television programmes were made about Roper, one in 1964 ("Mind into Metal – Frank Roper, Sculptor") and the other in 1976 ("Look, Stranger: Sculpture and Singing Fountains", in which Roper was interviewed by René Cutforth). Roper's non-religious sculpture includes cast aluminium figures of birds and animals, some of which were animated; and fountains that produced musical sounds using the principle of the water organ.

Two of Roper's works are in the collection of National Museum Wales: St Michael and the Devil and Horse.

Roper was awarded the MBE in 1991 for his services to art.

He died at the end of 2000. In 2014 an exhibition marking the centenary year of his birth was held at the Travellers Gallery, Barry. A memorial service at Llandaff Cathedral was held on the centenary date, 12 December 2014. The "Frank Roper Centre" opened in February 2019 at the Church of the Resurrection in Ely, Cardiff; a permanent exhibition of Roper's life and works.

Lost-polystyrene casting in aluminium

Roper was one of the first sculptors to adopt the lost-polystyrene method, almost always casting in aluminium, perfecting the technique in 1964. It is now used widely in manufacturing (known as lost-foam casting).

Over his career Roper worked in wood, stone and bronze, but many of his ecclesiastical commissions, as well as his musical fountains and water clocks, were cast in aluminium. He became interested in aluminium in the 1950s; the Stations of the Cross for St Martin's in Roath, Cardiff, completed in 1959, were an early example of his religious art in the metal.

His work for Christ Church in Roath (1964) may have been his first commission using the lost-polystyrene method, a casting process recognisable by the texture of the metal, as the pitted nature of the expanded polystyrene remains visible.

 
Modelling in expanded polystyrene allowed Roper to work on a larger scale. It is light and strong, enabling complicated structures to be built. The lower cost of aluminium, compared to bronze for example, made it possible to use sculpture where normally there would not be sufficient money available. Having his own home foundry also kept costs down and allowed for a very direct relationship with the finished work – "conception, creation and casting became one continuous process" he told the Church Times in 1994.

In the 1976 BBC documentary Look Stranger, Roper explains that he would sculpt from a solid block of expanded polystyrene using a hot wire, soldering irons, home-made whittlers and sand-paper:

"I like to use polystyrene. This is the most direct means of casting. One can enjoy the modelling and realise that the casting is very little effort. Once I've got the thing in polystyrene it's almost finished. The polystyrene is sunk into sand. I use dry sand from one of the beaches down here. You pour metal on top, then the polystyrene vaporises, the metal fills the space where the polystyrene was and you're left with an aluminium casting... if the casting fails I've lost the model."

Roper is credited with inventing the process although other artists were developing this technique at the same time, including the sculptor Geoffrey Clarke, working in East Anglia. The Canadian sculptor Armand Vaillancourt as well as Alfred M Duca, a sculptor and research associate at the Massachusetts Institute of Technology, are also noted to have been the first to cast in this way.

Stained and etched glass

Roper has stained glass or etched windows in over twenty churches in Wales and England. His wife Nora, an artist in her own right, influenced the colours
as well as the symbolism depicted in the designs, for example with the 'flower calendar' window in St Michael's Church, Michaelston-le-Pit and Christ in Majesty, a window in St  Illtyd's Church, Llantwit Fardre.

His approach to stained-glass windows was unique, combining cast aluminium forms with coloured antique glass and knapped chunks of float glass. These were bonded together in various formations and set into window openings creating a relief form of stained glass.

The cast aluminium incorporated within the designs often added further depth and dimension. "That's the important thing about them", Roper notes in the documentary Look Stranger, "they are primarily sculpture, so at night when there's no light coming in from outside we have an interesting relief." An example can be seen in Virgin and Child, a window in St Augustine's in Rumney, Cardiff; Peter Leech in The Religious Art of Frank Roper describes the "literally outstanding" metal "delineat[ing] the figure emerging from a profundity of deep blue glass".

The sculptural nature of his stained glass can also be seen in his windows depicting the Stations of the Cross at the Church of Our Lady Queen of Peace, Newcastle Emlyn, with Leech observing "the sombre metal silhouetted against the lambent glass".  Another set of Stations of the Cross can be found in St Peter's Church in Chippenham: small intensely coloured, built-in stained glass panels set within aluminium tracery.

Roper's window depicting the Resurrection in St Mary's, Talbenny, Pembrokeshire, one of three in that church, is an example of his use of small chunks of knapped glass fixed to the surface in order to catch and disperse light.

Perhaps his most notable examples of etched glass are at St Peter's Church in Chippenham, including the large St Peter's Window occupying an entire wall and featuring three predominant images of St Peter as well as images linked to St Peter's story. He and Nora were commissioned to provide a comprehensive scheme, which also included sculpture, a screen and stained-glass windows.

Ecclesiastical works

England

Wales

Notes

References

Sources

External links

 

1914 births
2000 deaths
Alumni of the Royal College of Art
British stained glass artists and manufacturers
People from Haworth
20th-century British sculptors
British male sculptors
Members of the Order of the British Empire
20th-century British male artists